Shankend railway station served the hamlet of Shankend, Scottish Borders, Scotland from 1862 to 1969 on the Border Union Railway.

History 
The station opened on 1 July 1862 by the Border Union Railway. The station was situated at the end of a drive off an access road to Shankend Farm and west of the B6399. The goods yard consisted of three loop sidings, one serving a cattle dock. A locomotive was often kept in the goods yard for banking on the climb up to Whitrope. The station was downgraded to an unstaffed halt on 3 July 1961, although the suffix 'halt' never appeared in the timetables. The station closed to goods traffic on 28 December 1964 remained open for passengers until 6 January 1969.

References

External links 

Disused railway stations in the Scottish Borders
Railway stations in Great Britain opened in 1862
Railway stations in Great Britain closed in 1969
Beeching closures in Scotland
Former North British Railway stations
1862 establishments in Scotland
1969 disestablishments in Scotland